The 1982–83 Liga Bet season saw Maccabi Ahi Nazareth, Maccabi Afula, Hapoel Ihud Tzeirei Jaffa and Maccabi Lazarus Holon win their regional divisions and promoted to Liga Alef.

At the bottom, Sektzia Ma'alot, Hapoel Bnei Rameh (from North A division), Beitar al-Amal Nazareth (from North B division), Beitar Hod HaSharon, Beitar Beit Dagan (from South A division), Hapoel Ofakim and Hapoel Gedera (from South B division) were all automatically relegated to Liga Gimel, whilst Hapoel Netanya (from North B division) folded during the season.

North Division A

North Division B

Hapoel Netanya folded during the season.

South Division A

South Division B

References
North A final table, North B final table, South A final table, South B final table Maariv, 29.5.83, Historical Jewish Press 

Liga Bet seasons
Israel
4